Velika Gorica (meaning "Great Vineyard/Forest") is the largest and most populous city in Zagreb County, Croatia. According to the 2011 census the city itself has a population of 31,341, while the municipality has a population of 63,517 inhabitants.

Velika Gorica is the centre of the historical Turopolje region. Franjo Tuđman Airport, the largest and busiest airport in Croatia, is located in the area of Velika Gorica.

Name
The name of the city consists of two words. The first one, "Velika", is an adjective, meaning big or great. Second one is "Gorica", which is in standard Croatian diminutive of the word "gora", meaning hill. But in local Kajkavian dialect, "gorica" means vineyard, hence literally translated city's name is  Great Vineyard or Big Vineyard. That is because this area was wine producing since ancient times.

Velika Gorica also has (or had) its names in other languages, notably Hungarian: Nagygoricza and German: Gross-Gorica.

Geography
Up until 1990 Velika Gorica had the status of a municipality and after that it became a part of Zagreb. Velika Gorica gained city status in 1995. The area of the old Municipality of Velika Gorica was split into three municipalities – Kravarsko, Orle and Pokupsko.

Velika Gorica is the largest settlement and the administrative centre of the traditional Turopolje region. Regarding the Turopolje name, among the most common opinions is that the name, meaning "Tur field", comes from an old Slavic word "tur" which means Aurochs, an ancient type of cattle with long horns, which was a symbol of fertility and the sun god. These cattle died out in the 16th century. The cattle were closely related to agriculture. Plowing had a symbolic meaning, the fertilization of Mother Earth, so these cattle were often assumed to have "sacred" characteristics. Because of its importance in the life of the plowmen, "tur" became the basis for numerous toponyms. However, as recently as the 16th century, Turopolje was called Campus Zagrebiensis, i.e. "Zagreb field", or just Campus (field). At that time the name was replaced by "Tur field", i.e. Turopolje.

The A11 (Zagreb-Sisak) highway is planned to become the western bypass of Velika Gorica. State route D31 will be the eastern bypass. It is planned that these bypasses will relieve the traffic along the overcrowded Velikogorička road, the fastest link between Zagreb and Velika Gorica .

Population
In the census of 2011, the total population of administrative area of the city (the municipality) was 63,517, in the following settlements:

 Bapča, population 129
 Bukovčak, population 65
 Buševec, population 886
 Cerovski Vrh, population 93
 Cvetković Brdo, population 32
 Črnkovec, population 412
 Donja Lomnica, population 1,732
 Donje Podotočje, population 375
 Drenje Šćitarjevsko, population 203
 Dubranec, population 349
 Gornja Lomnica, population 580
 Gornje Podotočje, population 491
 Gradići, population 1,860
 Gudci, population 374
 Gustelnica, population 118
 Jagodno, population 521
 Jerebić, population 41
 Ključić Brdo, population 214
 Kobilić, population 533
 Kozjača, population 342
 Kuče, population 1,453
 Lazi Turopoljski, population 57
 Lazina Čička, population 566
 Lekneno, population 383
 Lukavec, population 1,140
 Mala Buna, population 261
 Mala Kosnica, population 49
 Markuševec Turopoljski, population 328
 Mičevec, population 1,286
 Mraclin, population 1,074
 Novaki Šćitarjevski, population 158
 Novo Čiče, population 1,255
 Obrezina, population 555
 Ogulinec, population 292
 Okuje, population 467
 Petina, population 213
 Petravec, population 76
 Petrovina Turopoljska, population 708
 Poljana Čička, population 688
 Prvonožina, population 42
 Rakitovec, population 570
 Ribnica, population 802
 Sasi, population 159
 Selnica Šćitarjevska, population 535
 Sop Bukevski, population 85
 Staro Čiče, population 790
 Strmec Bukevski, population 366
 Šćitarjevo, population 442
 Šiljakovina, population 672
 Trnje, population 62
 Turopolje, population 952
 Velika Buna, population 856
 Velika Gorica, population 31,553
 Velika Kosnica, population 770
 Velika Mlaka, population 3,334
 Vukomerić, population 158
 Vukovina, population 947
 Zablatje Posavsko, population 61

History

Velika Gorica and surrounding plain area by the Sava river have always been fertile and lush so it is no wonder it has been constantly inhabited since Neolithic. First major settlement was Andautonia, founded in 1st century where village of Šćitarjevo stands nowadays. It was an important Roman port on Sava river and city on roads connecting Siscia with Emona and Poetovio. The Roman town was large at the beginning of the 5th century.

Croats came to these parts in the 8th century and remains from early Croat culture were found in numerous places around city of Velika Gorica. Velika Gorica is first mentioned in 1228 as a seat of parish. In 1278 noblemen from Turopolje joined into a union called Plemenita opčina turopoljska ("Noble municipality of Turopolje"). Plemenita opčina turopoljska was granted a rule over Turopolje by Croatian monarchs and exists still today with mainly ceremonial and not political role.

In the late 19th and early 20th century, Velika Gorica was a district capital in the Zagreb County of the Kingdom of Croatia-Slavonia.

The 20th century was by far the most important one in history of Velika Gorica as it grew from a small village of 2,871 inhabitants to an important and one of the largest cities in Croatia with population over 60 thousand inhabitants. Until 1995 Velika Gorica was part of City of Zagreb and since then it has a city status of its own.

During the Croatian War of Independence the city played an important role because of two airports in its near distance. Velika Gorica's 153rd brigade of Croatian Army fought on battlefields all around Croatia.

People

 Vladimir Bakarić - communist politician in Socialist Yugoslavia
 Ivana Banfić - pop singer
 Igor Bišćan - former football player
 Tomislav Butina - former football player
 Mario Cvitanović - former football player
 Martina Dalić - former Croatian Minister of Finance
 Barbara Jelić-Ružić - former volleyball player
 Gordan Kožulj - swimmer
 Tonino Picula - former Croatian Minister of Foreign Affairs
 Ivo Pukanić - journalist and editor of Nacional
 Rene Medvešek - actor
 Sonja Smolec - writer
 Ivan Šuker - former Croatian Minister of Finance
 Robert Troha - basketball player
 Jacques Houdek - singer
 Marcelo Brozović - football player
 Ivanka Mazurkijević - singer
 Ivana Mišerić - radio host
 Adrian Benko - esports player

Landmarks and sights
Main Velika Gorica's sight is the Turopolje Museum which traces human presence in Turopolje since Neolithic. There are also a number of monuments scattered around the city and its environs.

Vrata od krča ("The Timber Gate") is a unique wooden monument to human labour, risen up in forest near the city. Monument was risen in 1779 as a symbol of reclaiming the fertile land from forest. It was torn down by the flood in 1914 and restored two years later.

Old town Lukavec is a very well preserved fortification first mentioned in 1256 as Caput Lukavec. It was built by wood as a defense from Ottoman invasion. It was first owned by Zagreb noblemen and Turopolje noblemen gained control over castle in 1553 when it already became a ruin. It was soon rebuild in stone and became a regular site of assembly of Turopolje noblemen.

Wooden chapels from Turopolje and Pokuplje are unique in the world. They can be traced far back in the early Middle Ages, but most of the preserved ones date from the 17th century. Today there are only 11 preserved wooden chapels left, three in Turopolje, two in Vukomeričke gorice and six in Pokuplje. They were built by groups of timber-workers and as a rule they were made of oak-tree.

There are several small monuments to World War II anti-fascist resistance movement (most famous being The Bomber Man in near city center) and also many monuments to Croatian soldiers who fought in Croatian War of Independence. The city has a monument to soldiers from the city who lost their lives in the Croatian War of Independence.

In a competition held among 5,300 European cities, Velika Gorica was awarded the Silver Flower of Europe – an award presented by the European Association for Flowers and Landscape Entente Florale. The award was accepted on 9 September 2004, in the French town of Aix-les-Bains.

Education
Velika Gorica has four elementary schools (Eugen Kvaternik, Eugen Kumičić, Juraj Habdelić and Nikola Hribar) and four high schools (Vocational School Velika Gorica, Gymnasium Velika Gorica, Economy School of Velika Gorica and Aviation Technical School Rudolf Perešin). In addition, there is a higher education institute, the Velika Gorica University of Applied Sciences.

Culture

People's Open University
Established in 1960, the People's Open University (hr: Pučko otvoreno učilište, shortform POU) began a phase of rich and complex development in its first home, a building which was previously an inn, and which was situated opposite the present-day building of this institution at 37 Zagrebačka Street. In the year of its establishment the institution as connected with the already existing Public Library, and three years later, in 1963, by the Cinema Company “Prosvjeta”. Together, they conducted their activities in the former House of Cooperatives “Zadružni dom”, where the present administration is situated and a part of the POU's activities are still performed today.

By initiating and developing numerous activities the University has spread out to new locations. The most important step was made in 1980, when the Cultural Centre was built, with an art gallery, an additional library and a chamber hall in Galženica, a part of Velika Gorica.

In the late 1980s the University was also using space in the old Secondary School at 5 Zagrebačka Street (the Music School), in the House of Social Protection (Dom društvene samozaštite), today’s Fire Brigade building (the radio-station) and in the Podbrežnica settlement (the library). In 1993 the Music School moved to a new building in Kolarova Street where it has remained until the present day.

It was on the premises of the People's Open University that many people in Velika Gorica saw their first film or theatre performance, borrowed their first book or attended their first concert or exhibition. There they learned to play their first notes and master the basics of a foreign language. They entered a disco for the first time in their lives. They learned how to drive a car or heard their own voices on a radio station. Some of them, thanks to this broad spectrum of activities, published their first books or displayed their first exhibitions right here.

In recent years, the building of the Open University has been renovated and technically equipped. The philosophy of the institution has been to listen attentively to the needs of the local populace and design programmes in accord with their changing requirements.

Today, the People's Open University seeks to satisfy the diverse cultural needs of Velika Gorica's citizens through its theatre, gallery, concerts, publishing, cinema and other activities that encourage people to meet and exchange ideas. A great deal was achieved between 2006 and 2010, when actress Senka Bulić served as Head of the POU and brought the University's theatre, Scena Gorica, to the attention of the theatre-going public throughout the country. During her tenure Klub 100, a multimedia space for the development of urban culture, was additionally founded and became an important part of the cultural landscape for young people especially.

Libraries and galleries
Libraries and reading rooms have a long tradition in Turopolje, since there is a deeply rooted interest in and love for books in this region. The Velika Gorica city library is the descendant of the Reading Room in Velika Gorica, established in 1886. Since October 1999 it has operated independently in two locations: the Central Library at 37 Zagrebačka Street and the Regional Galženica Library at 5 S. Radić Square.

Turopolje Museum
Founded in 1960, the Turopolje Museum is concerned with the preservation and promotion of the cultural heritage of the historic Turopolje, Pokuplje, Posavina and Vukomeričke gorice regions. The Museum is housed in a building dating from 1750, which previously served as the city hall of the Noble Commune of Turopolje. It is situated in the centre of Velika Gorica, on the eastern edge of the main park. This two-storey building with a colonnade on the ground floor was built in a Baroque style with elements of the traditional Turopolje architectural style. Assemblies called “spravišća” were once held in the large hall on the upper floor. The rooms next to the hall were archives where the important documents of the Noble Commune were kept. The ground floor at one time housed prison cells. The Museum has a collection comprising some 3,500 objects and over 10,000 photographical records. The Museum library has around 700 volumes on subjects relating to the region's history.

Public monuments
At the end of the 1970s in particular, moderately intensive development of Velika Gorica's city centre and the surrounding districts took place. In an attempt to accommodate the need both for green space and for an aesthetic dimension to development, over the city history a number of parks have been created, most of which contain pieces of public sculpture.

The beginning of the 21st century was most important for urban uprising of Velika Gorica. New central park was created that carries the name of first Croatian president, dr. Franjo Tuđman. Tuđman's park soon became one of the most important urban spaces in Velika Gorica.

Sport

Sports clubs in Velika Gorica include the football clubs HNK Gorica and NK Udarnik, a men's handball club HRK Gorica, a women's volleyball club OK Azena and a men's basketball club KK Gorica.

HNK Gorica plays its home games at Stadion Radnik, built for 1987 Summer Universiade while NK Udarnik has its own field in Kurilovec neighborhood. Indoor sports are mainly played in the city sports hall. There also three elementary school sports halls in the city that are used by sports clubs for trainings and youth categories.

References

Sources

External links

Velika Gorica official web page
Velika-gorica.org – Informativni Portal Velike Gorice

 
Cities and towns in Croatia
Populated places in Zagreb County
Zagreb County (former)
13th-century establishments in Croatia
1228 establishments in Europe